The Nedbank Champions Challenge was a men's senior (over 50) professional golf tournament played from 2010 to 2012. The event featured an invited field of 8. Two rounds were played in 2010, increasing to three rounds in 2011 and 2012. It was held concurrently with the Nedbank Golf Challenge.

Winners

References

Senior golf tournaments
Golf tournaments in South Africa
Recurring sporting events established in 2010
2010 establishments in South Africa